Matthew Anthony "Matty" Harriott (born 23 September 1992) is a footballer who plays as a midfielder. He began his career with Sheffield United and has had spells on loan at Burton Albion, Alfreton Town and Hayes & Yeading United. He later played for Northampton Town. Born in England, Harriott was selected to represent Republic of Ireland at U19 level.

Club career

Sheffield United
Born in Luton, Harriott came through the youth ranks of Luton Town. He made a move to Sheffield United in August 2010. Progressing quickly with the Blades, he made his first team début for the Blades in the 84th minute of a 2–2 home match against Doncaster Rovers at Bramall Lane in early January 2011. Having made only one further appearance for the Yorkshire club Harriott joined Football League Two side Burton Albion on a one-month loan deal in March 2012. He made four appearances for the Brewers before returning to United after his loan spell was cut short following a change in managerial staff at Burton Albion. The following season Harriott joined Alfreton Town on a months loan in November 2012, which was later was extended until 6 January 2013, and again to the maximum 93 days allowed. Having made 13 appearances for Alfreton, Harriott returned to United but after failing to break into the first team Harriott left the club in June 2013 after they failed to offer him a new contract.

Northampton Town
After being released from the Blades, Harriott signed a one-year deal with Northampton Town on 30 August 2013. In November 2013 Harriott joined Hayes & Yeading United on loan until 14 December 2013.

International career
Harriott was selected for the Republic of Ireland Under 19s in January 2011.

Career statistics

References

External links
 
 Club profile at the Official Sheffield United site

1992 births
Living people
Footballers from Luton
English footballers
English people of Irish descent
Association football midfielders
Sheffield United F.C. players
Burton Albion F.C. players
Alfreton Town F.C. players
Northampton Town F.C. players
Hayes & Yeading United F.C. players
Wealdstone F.C. players
Wilmington Hammerheads FC players
English Football League players
National League (English football) players
People educated at Ashcroft High School
USL Championship players
English expatriate sportspeople in the United States
Expatriate soccer players in the United States
English expatriate footballers